Dan DeLeeuw is a visual effects supervisor and second unit director best known for his works on Marvel Cinematic Universe films.

Career 

DeLeeuw began his career in 1993 at Dream Quest Images and started out as a CGI technical director before becoming a digital effects supervisor on such films including The Mask, Crimson Tide, The Rock, Armageddon, Mighty Joe Young and Bicentennial Man. In 1996, Dream Quest was purchased by The Walt Disney Company and in 1999, Dream Quest was subsequently renamed "The Secret Lab".

In 2001, DeLeeuw worked as a co-visual effects supervisor on Reign of Fire alongside fellow DQI & TSL colleague Richard R. Hoover. That same year, Secret Lab closed its doors and DeLeeuw worked at Rhythm and Hues Studios from 2002 to 2011 on films such as Garfield: The Movie, Serenity and the first two Night at the Museum (franchise) films.

In 2012, DeLeeuw worked as a second unit visual effects supervisor on Marvel Studios' Iron Man 3, which was released in 2013 and later served as the overall visual effects supervisor on Captain America: The Winter Soldier, released in 2014. In 2015, he received his first Academy Award nomination for his work on the superhero spy thriller alongside Dan Sudick, Russell Earl and Bryan Grill.

In 2015, he collaborated once again with Marvel and the Russo brothers on Captain America: Civil War. The film was a commercial success grossing over $1.1 billion worldwide on a $250 million budget, becoming the highest-grossing film of 2016 and received positive reviews.

Through 2016–2019, DeLeeuw returned to collaborate with Marvel and the Russo's for their third & fourth collaborations on Avengers: Infinity War and Avengers: Endgame. Both films were shot back-to-back rather than simultaneously as originally planned, with filming for Infinity War taking place between January 23, 2017 & July 14, 2017 (reshoots took place between late 2017 & early 2018) and filming for Endgame taking place between August 10, 2017 & January 11, 2018. Approximately 890 hours of footage was shot between both films. Infinity War was made on a budget of $325–400 million and Endgame cost approximately $356–400 million, with the total budget of both films coming out to about $681–800 million. During the first set of reshoots for Endgame, which occurred between early-September 2018 & October 12, 2018, the production split into four units with the Russo brothers taking one each and the other two being supervised by DeLeeuw and one of the film's editors Jeffrey Ford, respectively. Endgame marked the first time DeLeeuw served as a second unit director.

Infinity War was released on April 27, 2018, and Endgame was released on April 26, 2019. Infinity War received praise for Josh Brolin's performance as Thanos, visual effects, action sequences, and emotional weight and became the fourth film & the first superhero film to gross over $2 billion worldwide, breaking numerous box office records, and becoming the highest-grossing film of 2018 and the fourth-highest-grossing film of all time both worldwide and in the United States and Canada. Endgame received praise for its direction, acting, musical score, action sequences, visual effects, & emotional weight, with critics lauding its culmination of the 22-film story and it grossed $2.798 billion worldwide, surpassing Infinity War's entire theatrical run in just eleven days and breaking numerous box office records, including becoming the highest-grossing film of all time from July 2019 until March 2021.

In 2019, Infinity War was nominated for the Academy Award for Best Visual Effects with DeLeeuw, production special effects supervisor Daniel Sudick, ILM senior supervisor Russell Earl & Digital Domain senior supervisor Kelly Port as the nominees and a year later in 2020, Endgame was nominated in the same category with DeLeeuw, Sudick, Earl & Weta lead supervisor Matt Aitken as the nominees.

Through 2019–2021, DeLeeuw marked his fifth & sixth collaboration with Marvel as a production side supervisor with the first season of the Disney+ series Loki alongside Bradley Parker and as a second unit director on Eternals with Stephane Ceretti as the film's overall supervisor of visual effects.

Filmography

As a visual effects artist

As second unit director

References

External links

Living people
Year of birth missing (living people)
Visual effects supervisors
Place of birth missing (living people)